Graphocephala coccinea is a meadow and woodland-dwelling species of brightly colored leafhopper native to North and Central America, from Canada south to Panama. Common names include candy-striped leafhopper, red-banded leafhopper, scarlet-and-green leafhopper and red-and-blue leafhopper.

Adults measure 6.7–8.4 mm in length and have vivid blue (or green) and red (or orange-red) stripes on their wings and the top of their thorax combined with bright yellow coloration on their head, legs, abdomen, and elsewhere.

Leafhoppers feed on plant sap with the aid of specialized mouthparts.

Pierce's disease

G. coccinea has been identified as one of several leafhopper species that is a vector in leaf scorch caused by the gammaproteobacteria Xylella fastidiosa ("Pierce's disease"). X. fastidiosa is responsible for the decline of certain woody plants such as elm, oak, and other ornamental trees. According to a research entomologist at the United States National Arboretum, "An understanding of the transmission of this bacterium by insect vectors is economically important because there is neither any known effective therapy for infected trees and shrubs nor a strategy for preventing infection." In California they damage valuable crops and in Germany they are a nuisance to people sitting under trees in public parks.

Subspecies
At least three subspecies of G. coccinea have been named: G. coccinea confluenta, G. coccinea punctata,   and G. coccinea sambuci (all Olsen 1918).

References

External links

Cicadellini
Hemiptera of North America
Insects described in 1771
Taxa named by Johann Reinhold Forster